Trapania scurra is a species of sea slug, a dorid nudibranch, a marine gastropod mollusc in the family Goniodorididae.

Distribution
This species was described from Luzon Island, Philippines. It has also been reported from Malaysia, Indonesia, the Marshall Islands and Japan.

Description
This goniodorid nudibranch is pale purple, with a pattern of white patches with thin lines of purple between them on the body. The gills and rhinophores are purple and the large lateral papillae are white with brown bands. The oral tentacles and adjacent part of the head are blue. The single animal known from the Marshall Islands has larger white patches and orange lateral papillae.

Ecology
Trapania scurra feeds on Entoprocta which often grow on sponges and other living substrata.

References

Goniodorididae
Gastropods described in 2008